Lieutenant General Dries van der Lith  is a former air force pilot who served as a Chief of Staff Planning in the SADF.

Military career

He served as Chief of Staff Planning from 1991 - 1992.

Awards and decorations

 
 
 
  SAAF Pilot's Wings (more than 2500 hours

References

Living people
Year of birth missing (living people)
South African Air Force generals